Dragon Oil plc is an independent international oil and gas exploration, development and production business. It is based and registered in Dubai and its operations are primarily located in Turkmenistan. The company was listed on the Irish Stock Exchange until it was acquired by the Emirates National Oil Company (ENOC). It is now a wholly owned upstream subsidiary of the ENOC-Group.

History
The company was established as Oliver Prospecting & Mining Co. Limited in Ireland by Dr. Oliver Conor Waldron in 1971. It changed its name to Dragon Oil in 1993 and invested in the Cheleken oilfield.

The Emirates National Oil Company bought a majority stake in the company in 1999 and the headquarters were moved to Dubai that same year.

In 1999, Dragon Oils signed a Production sharing agreement (PSA) with the Government of Turkmenistan, aiming to re-develop the Cheleken field in the Caspian Sea. The current PSA expires in 2025.

Between 2002 and 2005 Dragon Oil raised capital for exploration. In the period 2005 to 2015 in total eight exploration licences were taken in Algeria (2), Tunisia (1), the Filippines (1), Afghanistan (2), Iraq (1) and Egypt (1) (see the detailed information below in "Operations"). These were partly operated partly in JV partnership, and a separate, new DragonOil Exploration Department with new staff was set up to manage these assets.

In 2012 Dragon Oil launched a $200 million share buyback and the shares in Dubai rose 7 %. In 2013 Forbes ranked Dragon Oil on Forbes Global 2000 at place 1902.

From 2012 to 2015, Dragon Oil suffered setbacks caused by several delivery delays of a drilling platform, an important part of the companies progress in the Caspian Sea.

In June 2015 the Emirates National Oil Company acquired the remaining 46% of Dragon Oil for £3.7 billion, becoming the sole owner of Dragon Oil.
ENOC had attempted to buy the remaining percentage since 2009, at 455p a share, and offered 650p in March 2015. The final price was 800p a share, after extensive back and forth with different minority shareholders.

The company was delisted from the London and Irish Stock Exchange as of 7 September 2015.

In November 2015, the company was in talks to invest around $10 billion into a natural gas pipeline, the Tapi project, from Turkmenistan to India.
In 2016, Dragon pre-qualified for a bidding round for different new oil fields under new contract terms in Iraq and took part in a bidding round in 2018.

In August 2017, Dragon Oil signed a five-year contract with Topaz Energy & Marine for the delivery of six new offshore vessels, including five anchor-handlers and one Emergency Recovery and Response Vessel. In 2019 the company announced its plans to triple the production by 2025 as part of its upstream investment drive. In the next 10 years the company wanted to spend $13 billion to targets a higher production.

Overview of personnel
The board of directors consists of Chairman Sheikh Hamdan bin Rashid Al Maktoum and Vice Chairman Saeed Mohammed Al Tayer. Other board members are Abdulrahman Al Saleh, Hussain Hassan Mirza Al Sayegh, Ahmad Buti Al Muhairbi, Ahmad Sharaf, and Abdulrahman Al Awar.

The company's CEO is Ali Rashid Al Jarwan and its Assistant CEO is Faisal Rabee Al Awadhi. Other members of the senior management team are Fareed Abdulla Al Hashmi, Executive Director - Petroleum Development, Ahmad Ali Bin Obood, Director of Finance and Planning, Mana Bin Qutami, Executive Director of Corporate Services and Tayeb Huwair, Executive Director – Engineering & Projects.

Operations
Dragon Oils headquarters is in Dubai, UAE with all of the senior management based on site. Further offices are located in Mazar-i-Sharif, Afghanistan, Cairo, Egypt and Algiers, Algeria.

Its principal producing asset is at Cheleken, in the eastern section of the Caspian Sea, offshore from Turkmenistan. It is also involved in exploration activities in Tunisia. The field is operated from the onshore base near the town of Hazar, Turkmenistan.

Production from Cheleken reached  of oil per day in June 2015.

It is also involved in exploration activities in Afghanistan (Sanduqli and Mazar-i-Sharif blocks), Algeria (Tinrhert Nord Perimeter and Msari Akabli Perimeter), Egypt (East Zeit Bay), Iraq (Block 9) and Tunisia (the Bargou Exploration Permit). The legal process behind the Tunisian contracts has been questioned by Tunisian corruption watchdog I WATCH.

Past operations also include the Philippines, where Dragon Oil explored in the offshore Palawan Basin under agreement SC 63 until November 2015.

References

External links

 Official Dragon Oil website

Oil and gas companies of the United Arab Emirates
Companies based in Dubai
Energy companies established in 1971
Non-renewable resource companies established in 1971
1971 establishments in the United Arab Emirates